Flight is a 1929 American pre-Code adventure and aviation film directed by Frank Capra. The film stars Jack Holt, Lila Lee and Ralph Graves, who also came up with the story, for which Capra wrote the dialogue. Dedicated to the United States Marine Corps, the production was greatly aided by their full cooperation.

Plot
College football player Lefty Phelps (Ralph Graves) causes his school to lose the big game when he gets disoriented after a tackle and runs the wrong way. After being treated decently by gruff  U.S. Marine Corps Sergeant "Panama" Williams (Jack Holt), a spectator, Phelps decides to enlist in the Marines himself. He is selected to attend pilot training school at Naval Air Station Pensacola, where Williams is a flying instructor. When Williams finally recognizes Lefty, he befriends him and takes him under his wing. 

On his first attempt at solo flight, however, Lefty is taunted about the football game by fellow recruit Steve Roberts (Harold Goodwin), and cannot take off, resulting in a crash. Panama rescues Lefty from the burning aircraft, suffering burns to his hands. Lefty is "washed out" by his squadron commander, Major Rowell (Alan Roscoe).

Lefty is taken to the base hospital, where he falls for Navy nurse Elinor Murray (Lila Lee). When the "Flying Devils" squadron is sent to quell bandit attacks by the notorious General Lobo in Nicaragua, Panama arranges for Lefty to accompany him as his mechanic. Panama shows Lefty a photograph of Elinor, the love of his life, not knowing Lefty is in love with her too. When Elinor is sent to Nicaragua, she does not understand the guilt-stricken Lefty's cool reception. When the girl-shy Panama asks Lefty to propose to Elinor on his behalf, Elinor confesses her love for him instead, after which Panama accuses Lefty of betrayal.

An urgent call for help by a Marine outpost under bandit attack stops any confrontation. Lefty flies as gunner for Steve Roberts, who makes fun of him about shooting in the right direction. During the mission, their aircraft is shot down in a swamp. Unwilling to join in the rescue, Panama reports in sick, but once Elinor convinces him that Lefty never betrayed him, he flies his own solo rescue mission. At the crash site, Roberts dies of his injuries and is cremated by Lefty using their aircraft as a funeral pyre. Panama finds Lefty but is wounded by bandits led by General Lobo, after his landing. Lefty kills the attacking bandits, takes off, and brings the pair back, putting on an impressive flying display over the base that includes safely landing the aircraft after it loses a wheel. Sometime later, Lefty has won his wings and is now an instructor at the school, married to Elinor. When his wife arrives in their new car, Lefty accidentally pulls away in reverse.

Cast
Jack Holt as Gunnery Sergeant "Panama" Williams  
Lila Lee as Elinor Murray
Ralph Graves as Corporal "Lefty" Phelps 
Eddy Chandler* as Marine Sergeant, Panama's buddy
Edgar Dearing* as Football Coach
Jimmy De La Cruze* as "Lobo" Sandino, the bandit leader
Harold Goodwin* as Corporal Steve Roberts
George Irving* as Marine Colonel in Nicaragua
Alan Roscoe* as Major James D. Rowell
* uncredited

Production

At the time of production, Jack Holt's career with Columbia Pictures was as a leading man. Capra specifically asked for him to star as the laconic pilot and with the acquiescence of studio head Harry Cohn, his role in Flight was emblematic of the studio's reliance on the popular and profitable action film.

Receiving full cooperation from the Marine Corps, including the use of facilities and personnel at Naval Base San Diego and NAS North Island, provided the authentic settings Capra required. The initial flying sequence depicts the landing and taxi of an FB-1 fighter, with Holt stepping from the cockpit. {
The flight training sequences were staged using Consolidated NY-1B trainers based at San Diego. Nine Marine Corps Curtiss OC-2 aircraft from Marine Attack Squadron 231 (VMA-231) were featured in the aerial combat sequences. The squadron, along with VO-10M (Marine Observation Squadron 10), also prominently appeared in Devil Dogs of the Air (1935).

A total of 28 aircraft were at Capra's disposal and with the benefit of using actual aircraft, Capra did not have to rely on "process shots" or special effects which was the standard of the day, although dangerous crash scenes and a mass night takeoff were staged using studio miniatures. Along with principal aerial photographer, Elmer Dyer, who filmed from a camera-equipped aircraft, Capra flew alongside in a director's aircraft to coordinate the aerial scenes. Jack Holt who was an accomplished pilot, flew in the film but crashed during one scene. Capra pushed for aerial close-ups and in one scene, wanted Holt to stand up in the cockpit but his parachute had deployed, and he remained seated, causing the scene to be abandoned. Noted Marine Corps exhibition pilots Lts. Bill Williams and Jerry Jerome were also involved in the production.

Historical accuracy
Capra also shot on location in La Mesa and Fallbrook, California, used for the Nicaragua scenes. Although a fictional treatment, the military action depicted in Nicaragua was based on the Battle of Ocotal on July 16, 1927 when the Marines battled hundreds of Sandinista rebels. Importing fire ants for the swamp scene became controversial as the ants were capable of biting through the actors' clothing.

The opening scene where the football star takes off in the wrong direction was based on Capra's recalling a notable incident he witnessed, along with Columbia studio boss Harry Cohn, during the 1929 Rose Bowl when Roy Riegels was tackled by his own team after picking up a fumble and running toward his own goal line. Footage from the actual game is used.

Reception
Flight garnered a lukewarm response from critics and did well at the box office. Typical of the reviews was the one appearing in The New York Times: "During those all too brief moments when the producer skips away from melodramatic flubdub, tedious romantic passages and slapstick comedy and turns to scenes of airplanes in formation and flying stunts, 'Flight,' a talking film presented last night by Columbia Pictures Corporation at the George M. Cohan and dedicated to the United States Marines, is well worth watching." In a later day review, Alun Evans lumped the film in with similar propaganda films of the silent era that depicted US involvement in Mexican and Latin American conflicts.

Largely forgotten today, Flight is representative of Capra's early period and fits in well with the silent Submarine (1928) and later Dirigible (1931) as a trio of military-themed productions. Now available in home video, the film is rarely broadcast as it is considered a minor work in the Capra filmology.

References

Notes

Citations

Bibliography

 Blottner, Gene. Columbia Pictures Movie Series, 1926-1955: The Harry Cohn Years. Jefferson, North Carolina: McFarland & Company, 2011. .
 Capra, Frank. Frank Capra, The Name Above the Title: An Autobiography. New York: The Macmillan Company, 1971. .
 Dick, Bernard F. Columbia Pictures: Portrait of a Studio. Lexington, Kentucky: The University Press of Kentucky, 1992. I.
 Dolan Edward F. Jr. Hollywood Goes to War. London: Bison Books, 1985. .
 Evans, Alun. Brassey's Guide to War Films. Dulles, Virginia: Potomac Books, 2000. .
 Harwick, Jack and Ed Schnepf. "A Viewer's Guide to Aviation Movies". The Making of the Great Aviation Films, General Aviation Series, Volume 2, 1989.
 McBride, Joseph. Frank Capra: The Catastrophe of Success. New York: Touchstone Books, 1992. .
 Scherle, Victor and William Levy. The Films of Frank Capra. Secaucus, New Jersey: The Citadel Press, 1977. .

External links
 
 
 
 Flight at Virtual History

1929 films
1929 adventure films
American aviation films
American black-and-white films
Columbia Pictures films
Films directed by Frank Capra
Films about the United States Marine Corps
American adventure films
1920s English-language films
1920s American films
English-language adventure films